The World Allround Speed Skating Championships for Men took place on 11 and 12 February in Oslo at the Bislett Stadium ice rink.

It was for the third time that Eric Heiden became the world champion and he equaled the performances of the Norwegians Oscar Mathisen and Hjalmar Andersen and the Netherlander Ard Schenk.

Classification

 * = Fell
 DQ = Disqualified

Source:

References 

World Allround Speed Skating Championships, 1979
1979 World Allround

Attribution
In Dutch